Eileen Cassidy (22 August 1932 – 6 October 1995) was an Irish Fianna Fáil politician. A librarian, she was nominated by the Taoiseach to Seanad Éireann in 1977 and served until 1981. 

She was killed in an accident along with her husband Judge John Cassidy in 1995.

References

1932 births
1995 deaths
Fianna Fáil senators
Members of the 14th Seanad
20th-century women members of Seanad Éireann
Nominated members of Seanad Éireann